Kedam may refer to:
 Great frigatebird, also known as Kedam in Palauan
 Rael Kedam, Palauan ridge
 PSS Kedam, patrol boat named after the bird
 Kedam, character in Ultraman Max

See also
 Kadam (disambiguation)